The first season of the television comedy series 30 Rock originally aired between October 11, 2006, and April 26, 2007, on NBC in the United States. The season was produced by Broadway Video, Little Stranger and NBC Universal, and the executive producers were series creator Tina Fey, Lorne Michaels, Joann Alfano, Marci Klein, and David Miner.

The series focuses on TGS with Tracy Jordan, a fictional sketch comedy series, and its head writer Liz Lemon, portrayed by Fey, as she juggles her job and her personal life. The season consisted of 21 episodes; 19 episodes were approximately 22 minutes long, and the other two episodes were approximately 26 minutes long due to NBC "supersizing" those episodes. The season moved timeslots three times during its run. The first four episodes aired on Wednesdays at 8:00 pm, the next thirteen episodes aired on Thursdays at 9:30 pm, and the final four episodes aired on Thursdays at 9:00 pm.

The season received generally favorable reviews, and was nominated for ten Emmy Awards: six Primetime Emmy Awards and four Creative Arts Emmy Awards. Despite critical success, the series struggled in the ratings, and the first season averaged 5.8 million viewers for all 21 episodes. The 30 Rock first season DVD box set was released on September 4, 2007, in Region 1 format, and was released on March 17, 2008, in Region 2 format.

Synopsis
The season begins with the introduction of Liz Lemon, the head writer of The Girlie Show, a live sketch comedy series which airs on NBC. When The Girlie Shows network executive Gary dies, Jack Donaghy replaces him. Jack, the head of east coast television and microwave oven programming, makes many changes to The Girlie Show, including adding Tracy Jordan (Tracy Morgan), a loose cannon movie star, to the show's cast and changing the title of The Girlie Show to TGS with Tracy Jordan. Various story arcs are explored, including the rivalry between Tracy and Jenna Maroney (Jane Krakowski), Liz's relationships with Dennis Duffy (Dean Winters) and Floyd Debarber (Jason Sudeikis) and Jack's relationship with Phoebe (Emily Mortimer). Most importantly, the relationship between Jack and Liz develops as he offers to be her mentor, which becomes the anchor of the show. A few minor story arcs are carried over into season two, including Cerie Xerox's (Katrina Bowden) ongoing engagement to the unseen character Aris and Pete Hornberger (Scott Adsit) living with Liz to deal with his marital problems with his wife, Paula Hornberger (later seen in "Greenzo" played by Paula Pell).

Crew
The season was produced by Broadway Video, Little Stranger, Inc. and NBCUniversal and aired on NBC in the United States. The executive producers were creator Tina Fey, Lorne Michaels, Joann Alfano, Marci Klein and David Miner, with Brett Baer, Dave Finkel, Jack Burditt, and John Riggi acting as co-executive producers. Robert Carlock acted as co-executive producer from the episode "Pilot" until the episode "Black Tie." Carlock was then credited as an executive producer, starting with the episode "Up All Night" onwards, except for the episode "The C Word" which was aired out of production order. Producers for the season were music composer Jeff Richmond and Jerry Kupfer, with Irene Burns, Matt Hubbard and Diana Schmidt acting as co-producers.

There were eight different directors throughout the season. The staff writers were Tina Fey, John Riggi, Robert Carlock, Jack Burditt, Dave Finkel, Brett Baer, co-producer Matthew Hubbard and Kay Cannon who all wrote, or co-wrote at least two episodes. Daisy Gardner, who co-wrote the episode "The Source Awards" with Robert Carlock, was a guest writer. Those who directed more than one episode were supervising producer Adam Bernstein, Gail Mancuso, Don Scardino, Michael Engler, and Beth McCarthy. There were three directors who only directed one episode each throughout the season; they were Juan J. Campanella, Scott Ellis, and Dennie Gordon. Fey and Carlock acted as the show runners for the season.

Cast

Seven actors received star billing during season one. Tina Fey portrayed Liz Lemon, the head writer of a fictitious live sketch comedy television series named TGS with Tracy Jordan (commonly known as TGS). The TGS cast consists of three actors, two of whom are part of the main cast of the first season of 30 Rock. They are the loose cannon movie star Tracy Jordan, portrayed by Tracy Morgan and the dense, limelight-craving Jenna Maroney, portrayed by Jane Krakowski. Jack McBrayer played the naïve Southern-born NBC page, Kenneth Parcell. Scott Adsit acted as the witty and wise TGS producer, Pete Hornberger. Judah Friedlander portrayed the wise-cracking, trucker hat wearing, repulsive staff writer Frank Rossitano. Alec Baldwin played the high flying NBC network executive Jack Donaghy who, at the beginning of the season, is employed to retool TGS. Donaghy's full title at the start of the series is "Head of East Coast Television and Microwave Oven Programming."

The season also includes a number of secondary characters including Keith Powell as James "Toofer" Spurlock, a writer for TGS, and Lonny Ross as Josh Girard who is a staff writer of TGS as well as a TGS cast member. Katrina Bowden was TGSs general assistant, Cerie Xerox. These actors were promoted to main cast members in season two. Other recurring roles include Maulik Pancholy as Jonathan, Grizz Chapman as "Grizz" Griswold, Kevin Brown as "Dot Com" Slattery, John Lutz as J.D. Lutz, and Chris Parnell as Dr. Leo Spaceman.

Main cast
Tina Fey as Liz Lemon, the head writer of TGS, a live sketch comedy television show. (21 episodes)
Tracy Morgan as Tracy Jordan, a loose cannon movie star and cast member of TGS. (21 episodes)
Jane Krakowski as Jenna Maroney, a vain, fame-obsessed TGS cast member and Liz's best friend. (16 episodes)
Jack McBrayer as Kenneth Parcell, a naïve, television-loving NBC page from Georgia. (20 episodes)
Scott Adsit as Pete Hornberger, the witty and wise producer of TGS. (17 episodes)
Judah Friedlander as Frank Rossitano, an immature staff writer for TGS. (21 episodes)
Alec Baldwin as Jack Donaghy, a high-flying NBC network executive who becomes a mentor to Liz. (21 episodes)

Recurring cast
Katrina Bowden as Cerie Xerox, the young, attractive TGS general assistant. (15 episodes)
Keith Powell as James "Toofer" Spurlock, a proud African-American staff writer for TGS. (15 episodes)
Lonny Ross as Josh Girard, a young, unintelligent TGS cast member. (15 episodes)
Maulik Pancholy as Jonathan, Jack's assistant who is obsessed with him. (14 episodes)
Kevin Brown as Walter "Dot Com" Slattery, a member of Tracy's entourage. (11 episodes)
Grizz Chapman as Warren "Grizz" Griswold, a member of Tracy's entourage. (11 episodes)
Rachel Dratch as various characters (11 episodes)
John Lutz as J.D. Lutz, a lazy, overweight TGS writer who is often ridiculed by his co-workers. (8 episodes)
Jason Sudeikis as Floyd DeBarber, an attorney working for GE and love interest for Liz. (7 episodes)
Chris Parnell as Dr. Leo Spaceman, a physician who practices questionable medical techniques. (5 episodes)
Emily Mortimer as Phoebe, a British art dealer and gold digger who Jack falls for. (3 episodes)
Dean Winters as Dennis Duffy, Liz's immature ex-boyfriend. (3 episodes)
Ghostface Killah as himself (2 episodes)
Isabella Rossellini as Bianca Donaghy, Jack's ex-wife. (2 episodes)
Rip Torn as Don Geiss, CEO of GE and Jack's boss and mentor. (2 episodes)

Guest stars
Will Arnett as Devon Banks, NBC's Vice President of West Coast News, Web Content and Theme Park Talent Relations and Jack's nemesis. (Episode: "Fireworks")
Joy Behar as herself (Episode: "Up All Night")
Wayne Brady as Steven Black, Tracy's manager who Liz briefly dates. (Episode: "The Source Awards")
Tucker Carlson as himself (Episode: "Hard Ball")
Anna Chlumsky as Liz Lemler, an accountant for TGS and Floyd's girlfriend. (Episode: "The Fighting Irish")
Siobhan Fallon Hogan as Patricia Donaghy, Jack's sister. (Episode: "The Fighting Irish")
Will Forte as Tomas, a servant of Prince Gerhardt. (Episode: "Black Tie")
Whoopi Goldberg as herself (Episode: "The Rural Juror")
Donald Glover as young P.A. (Episode: "Jack-Tor")
Sean Hayes as Jesse Parcell, Kenneth's hillbilly cousin. (Episode: "Hiatus")
LL Cool J as Ridikolus, a famous hip-hop producer. (Episode: "The Source Awards")
Nathan Lane as Eddie Donaghy, Jack's con-man brother. (Episode: "The Fighting Irish")
Chris Matthews as himself (Episode: "Hard Ball")
Stephanie March as Gretchen Thomas, a lesbian and friend of Jack's who he sets up on a date with Liz. (Episode: "Blind Date")
John McEnroe as himself (Episode: "The Head and the Hair")
Conan O'Brien as himself (Episode: "Tracy Does Conan")
Maury Povich as himself (Episode: "Fireworks")
Aubrey Plaza as an NBC page. (Episode: "Tracy Does Conan")
Al Roker as himself (Episode: "Fireworks")
Paul Reubens as Prince Gerhardt, the last surviving member of the Habsburg dynasty. (Episode: "Black Tie")
Molly Shannon as Katherine Catherine Donaghy, Jack's sister. (Episode: "The Fighting Irish")
Sherri Shepherd as Angie Jordan, Tracy's no-nonsense wife. (Episode: "Up All Night")
Elaine Stritch as Colleen Donaghy, Jack's cold and overbearing mother. (Episode: "Hiatus")

Episodes

Reception

Critical reception

On Rotten Tomatoes, the season has an approval rating of 84% with an average score of 7.5 out of 10 based on 43 reviews. The website's critical consensus reads, "It isn't as consistently as funny as it could be, considering its pedigree, but 30 Rock is a clever, wacky comedy that benefits from a strong ensemble cast." Metacritic gave the season a Metascore—a weighted average based on the impression of 31 critical reviews—of 67%, signifying generally favorable reviews. The pilot episode was generally well received; however, Marc D. Allan of The Washington Post said that "viewers who tuned in for the first month or more saw shows that weren't consistently funny", but after a few episodes "the writers discovered the core of the series—the push-pull between Fey's character, Liz Lemon, the harried head writer of The Girlie Show, and Alec Baldwin's domineering network executive, Jack Donaghy—that 30 Rock found its rhythm." Henry Goldblatt of Entertainment Weekly, whilst reviewing the DVD release of the season, called 30 Rock "[the 2006 –2007 television season's] finest sitcom". Goldblatt said that the episodes "Hard Ball" and "The Break Up" were "some of the strongest episodes", and awarded the first season an "A" grade.

Christopher Monfette of IGN thought that season one was "well-written and hilariously-performed" and that it was "refreshing to travel through the season and watch these characters grow and evolve". Monfette gave the season a score of 8 out of 10. UGO Entertainment's Kyle Braun said that the season "didn't start out as the funniest new show of 2006", but he praised the seasons progression, proclaiming "now that the show has found its audience, it's hard to argue with the laughs thrown down from high atop 30 Rockefeller Plaza." Anna Johns of TV Squad said that she was "particularly excited for the later two-thirds of the season, when Tina Fey and Tracy Morgan got into their groove and the supporting characters started getting better story lines." After six episodes, NBC picked 30 Rock up for a 21-episode season on December 1, 2006.

Ratings
The pilot episode garnered 8.13 million viewers, finishing third in its timeslot of 8:00 pm Eastern Standard Time. After three further low rated airings on the following three Wednesdays, including a series low of 4.61 million viewers, NBC decided to move 30 Rock to Thursdays at 9:30 pm. Its first airing on a Thursday night was on November 16, 2006. Along with this change, the even lower rated comedy Twenty Good Years was put on hiatus and later cancelled. 30 Rocks first Thursday airing was viewed by 5.19 million viewers. The series then received ratings of a consistent amount of around 5.5 million viewers till the episode "Hard Ball" when a series low, set by the episode "Jack the Writer," was met with just 4.61 million viewers watching the episode. After a further three episodes, which were higher rated than "Hard Ball," NBC moved 30 Rock to 9:00 pm on Thursdays, serving as a lead-in to Scrubs. Upon its first airing at 9:00 pm, the episode "Fireworks," a "supersized" episode attracted the attention of 5.37 million viewers. 30 Rock aired at 9:00 pm for four episodes. The season finale, "Hiatus," was watched by 4.72 million people. The first season averaged 5.8 million viewers for all 21 episodes. Out of all regular primetime programming that aired during the 2006–2007 American television season, 30 Rock ranked #102 out of #142 according to the Nielsen ratings system.

Awards

References

External links 

 
 

 
2006 American television seasons
2007 American television seasons